Joseph Frank Dines (12 April 1886 – 27 September 1918) was an English amateur footballer who competed in the 1912 Summer Olympics.

He represented Great Britain as part of the England national amateur football team, which won the gold medal in the football tournament. He played all three matches.

Dines was born in King's Lynn, Norfolk, where he worked as a school teacher alongside playing local football in the town. He is listed in the 1901 census as a National Schools' Monitor. Dines later moved to the Ilford/South Woodford area, playing for local non-league club Ilford. Dines resisted attempts to become a professional, however played for Liverpool, Walthamstow Avenue and Millwall, as well as featuring for Norwich City and Woolwich Arsenal's reserves during his time at Lynn Town. During the First World War, he served in the Army Ordnance Corps, the Middlesex Regiment, the Machine Gun Corps and latterly as a second-lieutenant in the King's Liverpool Regiment. He was killed, aged 31, in Pas-de-Calais on the Western Front, He is buried in Hagnicourt.

See also
 List of Olympians killed in World War I

References

External links
 
 LFC profile
 King's Lynn Profile

1886 births
1918 deaths
Military personnel from Norfolk
Burials in France
British military personnel killed in World War I
King's Regiment (Liverpool) officers
English footballers
English Olympic medallists
England amateur international footballers
King's Lynn F.C. players
Norwich City F.C. players
Arsenal F.C. players
Queens Park Rangers F.C. players
Ilford F.C. players
Liverpool F.C. players
Walthamstow Avenue F.C. players
Millwall F.C. players
Footballers at the 1912 Summer Olympics
Olympic footballers of Great Britain
Olympic gold medallists for Great Britain
Olympic medalists in football
Medalists at the 1912 Summer Olympics
Association football defenders
Sportspeople from King's Lynn
British Army personnel of World War I
Royal Army Ordnance Corps soldiers
Middlesex Regiment soldiers
Machine Gun Corps soldiers